The 1990–91 Buffalo Sabres season was the 21st season for the National Hockey League franchise that was established on May 22, 1970.

Offseason

Regular season

Final standings

Schedule and results

Playoffs
1991 Stanley Cup playoffs

Player statistics

Awards and records

Transactions

Draft picks
Buffalo's draft picks at the 1990 NHL Entry Draft held at the BC Place in Vancouver, British Columbia.

Farm teams

See also
1990–91 NHL season

References

Buffalo
Buffalo Sabres
Buffalo Sabres seasons
Buffalo
Buffalo